The 24th European Men's Artistic Gymnastics Championships were held in Bremen, Germany from 25 May to 28 May 2000. This event was for male gymnasts in both senior and junior levels.

Medalists

Medal table

Combined

Seniors

Juniors

Senior results
Full results of men's senior competition.

Teams

All-around

Floor

Pommel horse

Rings

Vault

Parallel bars

Horizontal bar

Junior results
Full results of men's junior competition.

Team

All-around

Floor

Pommel horse

Rings

Vault

Parallel bars

Horizontal bar

References

European Artistic Gymnastics Championships
2000 in gymnastics
2000 in European sport
International gymnastics competitions hosted by Germany